Claudette Masdammer (30 March 1939 – 13 November 2013) was a Guyanese sprinter. She competed in the women's 100 metres and women's 200 metres at the 1956 Summer Olympics. She was the first woman to represent Guyana at the Olympics. She also competed in the 1958 British Empire and Commonwealth Games.

References

External links
 

1939 births
2013 deaths
Athletes (track and field) at the 1956 Summer Olympics
Guyanese female sprinters
Olympic athletes of British Guiana
Athletes (track and field) at the 1958 British Empire and Commonwealth Games
Commonwealth Games competitors for British Guiana
Afro-Guyanese people
Place of birth missing
Olympic female sprinters